Reginald Mohun (1605 – c. 1642) of Trewynard (Trewinnard, St Erth) in Cornwall, was a Member of Parliament for Lostwithiel, Cornwall, in 1626.

Origins
He was born in 1605, the 2nd son of Sir Reginald Mohun, 1st Baronet (1564–1639) of Boconnoc in Cornwall, by his 3rd wife Dorothy Chudleigh, a daughter of John Chudleigh (1565-1589), MP, of Ashton in Devon, and sister of Sir George Chudleigh, 1st Baronet (c.1578-1658), MP for Lostwithiel, Cornwall, in 1621 and 1625 and for East Looe, Cornwall, in 1614.

Career
He matriculated at Exeter College, Oxford on 13 December 1622, aged 17, and was awarded BA on 10 June 1624. He was a student of law at the Middle Temple in 1625. In 1625, he was elected a Member of Parliament for Lostwithiel, Cornwall, in a double return which was probably not resolved in the time of the parliament. 

This election result is not recognised in his History of Parliament biography. He was definitively re-elected MP for Lostwithiel in 1626.

Marriage and children
He married twice:
Firstly to Mary Southcote, a daughter of Sir George Southcote of Shillingford, Devon, MP, by whom he had one son and one daughter:
Reginald Mohun, a minor at the death of his father;
Dorothy Mohun (born 1636)
Secondly, to a certain Dorothy, of unrecorded family, who survived him.

Death
He died before 15 August 1642 when his will was proved.

Sources
History of Parliament biography

References

1605 births
1642 deaths
Alumni of Exeter College, Oxford
Members of the pre-1707 English Parliament for constituencies in Cornwall
English MPs 1626
Younger sons of baronets